Orchard Road, often known colloquially as simply Orchard, is a major –long road in the Central Area of Singapore. Known as a famous tourist attraction, it is an upscale shopping area of Singapore, with numerous internationally renowned department stores, restaurants and coffeehouses located in its vicinity.

The Orchard Planning Area is a planning area as specified by the Urban Redevelopment Authority. It is part of the Central Area located within the Central Region. Orchard is bordered by Newton in the east and north, Tanglin in the west, River Valley in the south and Museum to the southeast.

Toponymy
Orchard Road got its name from the nutmeg, pepper and fruit orchards or the plantations that the road once led to. Such plantations were common in the area in the 19th century. Previously, it was known in Hokkien as "Tang Leng Pa Sat Koi", and in Tamil, it was known as "Vairakimadam" inside town limits and "Māttu Than" from Koek's Market to Upper Tanglin.

Geography
After more than a century as a two-way thoroughfare, Orchard Road became a one-way street east of Scotts Road in 1974. and entirely in 1977 when Orchard Boulevard was completed. The ever-lively street starts at the junction with Orange Grove Road which is the location of the Orchard Hotel. It then stretches southeast across the Scotts Road–Paterson Hill junction, Orchard MRT station, Bideford Road, Somerset MRT station, Central Expressway, Dhoby Ghaut MRT station, and ends at the junction with Handy Road (just before Prinsep Street), where it becomes Bras Basah Road. It has an extensive underground infrastructure, including underground pedestrian walkways between the malls running underneath the street and other streets in the vicinity. The numbers begin at Handy Road and end at Orange Grove Road.

History

British administration
Orchard Road was already cut in the 1830s, though the new road was not named in George Coleman's 1836 Map of Singapore. In the 1830s the Orchard Road area was the scene of gambier and pepper plantations. Later, nutmeg plantations and fruit orchards predominated, hence its name.

By 1846, the spread of houses had reached up to Tank Road. There were none on the left side and only three or four houses went past Tank Road on the right side of Orchard Road.

One major sight during this period was a Dr. Jun tending his garden, which helped endorse the road's name. He had a garden and plantation at the corner of what is now Scotts Road and Orchard Road.

Towards the later part of the 1840s, graveyards began to appear along the road. By 1846, the Chinese had a large graveyard around what is now the Meritus Mandarin Hotel and Ngee Ann City, while the Sumatrans from Bencoolen had their burial ground where the current Hotel Grand Central stands. Later a Jewish cemetery was established; it was located where Dhoby Ghaut MRT station is now and was demolished in 1984.

In the 1860s, Orchard Road had a great number of private houses and bungalows on hills looking down through the valley where the road passed through. Early in the 1890s, King Chulalongkorn, the then King of Siam, acquired "Hurricane House" in the vicinity of Orchard Road through Tan Kim Ching, the Thai Consul in Singapore. Two further pieces of adjoining property fronting onto Orchard Road were purchased in 1897. These subsequently became the site of the Royal Thai Embassy at 370 Orchard Road. Hurricane House was sold off around 1909 shortly before the King's death.

In the early 20th century, it was noted that Orchard Road "present[ed] the appearance of a well-shaded avenue to English mansion[s]," comparable in its "quiet but effective beauty to Devonshire lanes."

In the 1960s, a group of Indonesian forces bombed the Orchard road HSBC building in Singapore, just a few months before Singapore got its independence from Malaysia. A number of people were killed and the police managed to execute the two military officers responsible for this.

Smoking ban 

Orchard Road was initially designated to be completely smoke-free with the exception of designated smoking areas by 1 July 2018. However, the implementation was pushed back to 31 December 2018, as businesses will need more time to identify appropriate locations and set up designated areas for smoking, according to the National Environment of Agency (NEA). Food establishments that currently have smoking corners within the no-smoking zones will also be given the same extension to remove them. Currently, around 40 designated smoking areas have been set up, including five public ones at Orchard Towers, Far East Plaza, The Heeren, Cuppage Terrace, and behind Somerset MRT station. Since its announcement, NEA has said that the majority of stakeholders have been supportive of this initiative.

As of 1 January 2019, Orchard Road was officially declared as a strictly smoke-free zone except within the designated smoking areas.

Notable past and present landmarks

At Orchard Road's eastern end is official residence and office of the President of Singapore, the Istana, marked with Nibong palms and a plaque that reads, "As the nibong is a mangrove palm, this site must have once been a mangrove swamp."

Singapore's first Prime Minister Lee Kuan Yew's house is located at 38 Oxley Road, which is just south of Orchard Road.

On the western side of Orchard Road is the Singapore Botanic Gardens, the only tropical garden in the world that is a UNESCO World Heritage Site.

About halfway down Orchard Road are Cairnhill and Emerald Hill which are mainly private residential areas. Next to Emerald Hill is Centrepoint, which houses the supermarket Cold Storage, the oldest surviving business establishment in the area. Amber Mansions, one of the earliest apartment blocks in Singapore which was built around the turn of the 20th century, was torn down in the 1980s to make way for the Dhoby Ghaut MRT station.

Specialists' Shopping Centre was one of the earliest redevelopment projects on Orchard Road. It occupied the site of the former Pavilion Cinema, which was demolished in 1979. Specialists' Shopping Centre was itself demolished in 2007 to make way for new development, called Orchard Gateway.

Elsewhere just off Orchard Road is Scotts Road. Scotts Shopping Centre housed Singapore's first food court, which sat below the Ascott Singapore. It was torn down in June 2007 to make way for Scotts Square.

Shopping

The first shop of note on Orchard Road was Tangs founded in 1934 and established on Orchard Road in the 1950s.

Orchard Road is flanked by hotels and pedestrian shopping centres housing numerous upmarket restaurants, coffee chains, cafés, nightclubs.

Tanglin Mall is located at the junction of Tanglin Road and Grange Road. Its customer base is made up of expatriates, yuppies and professionals. Anchor tenants include Tanglin Market Place, a gourmet supermarket and bakery, and Tasty Food Court where up to 15 varieties of local cuisine can be found.

Orchard Central distinguishes itself from other shopping centres on Orchard Road with unique architectural designs. Fronted by an exterior featuring local artist Matthew Ngui's digital art membrane, the shopping centre offers cluster concept shopping by grouping complementary offerings for shoppers. The shopping centre houses the world's tallest indoor Via Ferrata climbing wall, a large collection of public art installations by international artists and a 24/7-operational Roof Garden and Discovery Walk. The Roof Garden offers dining options on an open-air veranda.

American fashion retailer Abercrombie & Fitch opened a flagship store on Orchard Road on 15 December 2011.

In 2017, technology company Apple opened an official Apple Store on Orchard Road.

List of shopping centers
313@Somerset – This mall was one of the first major fully integrated retail developments undertaken by the Lend-Lease Group in Asia. It marks its first green field development in Asia and its first development in Orchard Road. It houses Singapore's largest Forever 21 and Zara retail stores, including a HMV which moved from The Heeren. 
SCAPE
Cathay Cineleisure Orchard 
The Centrepoint – The shopping centre opened in 1983 with Robinsons and Marks and Spencer as its anchor tenants. It underwent renovation and built a new extension in 2007. Metro took over Robinsons' space in 2014.
Design Orchard – This two and a half storey building is the junction of Orchard & Cairnhill Roads opened in 2019 and promotes local designers by providing a high-profile retail space on ground level, and incubation spaces at level 2–3. The sloped rooftop acts as a public park and amphitheatre. 
Far East Plaza – Far East Plaza opened in 1982 with a Metro which has since closed down. Popular with students due to its cheap fashion items as well as inexpensive food, the plaza is also known for its cheap food outlets. The shopping complex has since undergone renovation.
Forum The Shopping Mall – Forum sells mainly branded children's clothes and accessories with a Toys "R" Us on the third floor. It also has a number of branded boutiques such as Emporio Armani and Dolce and Gabbana.
The Heeren Shops – This shopping complex targets fashionable, young, working-age shoppers. It is also popular among teenagers, and has a variety of niche shops. Previously home to one of two T.G.I. Friday's on the island, the site was formerly a colonial building, and currently houses the largest Robinsons in the country. Robinsons previously anchored The Centrepoint, but moved to The Heeren in 2014.
Hilton Singapore – Located inside the hotel itself, the Hilton Shopping Gallery houses branded boutiques such as Louis Vuitton, Cartier, Bulgari, Lanvin, Donna Karan, Balenciaga and Dolce & Gabbana. It also includes Club21, a high-end Singapore based company that sell luxury items such as Mulberry, Comme des Garçons and Dries van Noten.
ION Orchard – ION Orchard opened on 21 July 2009 and houses six double-storey flagship stores of close to  each, including Prada, Giorgio Armani, Louis Vuitton, Dior, Dolce & Gabbana, Cartier, Patek Philippe, Jaeger-LeCoultre, and Vacheron Constantin. Its signature glass façade doubles up as a giant media screen as well.
Liat Towers – International names such as Audemars Piguet, Massimo Dutti, Hermès and Zara are housed in the building. The building once housed Planet Hollywood and Singapore's first McDonald's. At one point in time it also housed the Isetan department store.
Lucky Plaza – Opened in 1981, it is one of the oldest shopping malls which opened along Orchard Road.
Mandarin Gallery – Located inside Meritus Mandarin Singapore housing international high-end brands like Y-3, Bape and Hugo Boss.
Ngee Ann City – The shopping centre opened in 1993 and is the largest in the Orchard Road shopping belt. It houses branded boutiques such as Louis Vuitton, Hermès, Burberry, Loewe and Chanel as well as Japanese department store, Takashimaya. The complex is home to Southeast Asia's second-largest bookstore, Books Kinokuniya.
Orchard Central – Singapore's first and tallest vertical shopping complex, which replaced the former carpark of Specialists' Shopping Centre and opened on 2 July 2009.
Orchard Gateway – Replaced Specialists' Shopping Centre, also opened in the year 2014.
Orchard Plaza
Orchard Point – Before being home to local department store OG, the complex used to have art galleries.
Orchard Towers – An 18-story twin towers office building with the first five floors containing a combination of bars and retail outlets while remaining floors are leased as office space. One tower also consists of condominium units. It also houses 3 embassies on various floors
Palais Renaissance – Palais Renaissance was completed in 1993 and mainly houses upmarket branded boutiques such as Donna Karen and Valentino.
Paragon – The Paragon is a high-end shopping centre selling branded items such as Gucci (whose flagship store operates here), as well as Miu Miu, Prada, Coach, and Burberry with a Metro department store and a Marks & Spencer store as well. The place has a Toys 'R' Us and a number of restaurants. It underwent expansion around 2002, taking over the land once occupied by another shopping centre, The Promenade.  The Promenade was built on the former location of Fitzpatrick's supermarket.
Plaza Singapura – Located next to the Istana, the shopping centre opened in 1974 with a now-defunct Yaohan department store. It was revamped thrice, in 1998, 2003 and 2012 with the former being a total revamp, and the latter a new mix of tenants. It currently houses a Golden Village cineplex, Cold Storage and Uniqlo. A Carrefour branch used to be located here until Carrefour pulled out of Singapore.
Scotts Square - Comprises a 3-storey boutique luxury mall with V-ZUG, Lady M New Rork and Fairprice Finest located here. Just above the mall are the luxury residences by the same developer.
Shaw House and Centre – Shaw House is home to the Isetan department store, and on the fifth and sixth floors the one of the largest cinema halls in Singapore, Lido 8 Cineplex, resides. This mall is also home to a number of shops such as Fendi, Loewe and Celine.
T Galleria by DFS – This duty-free shopping shopping centre is on Scotts Road, and mainly sells luxury goods, including products from Bottega Veneta, Louis Vuitton, Prada, Gucci, Hermès, Loewe and Bvlgari.
Tang Plaza – Tang Plaza is where the homegrown department store, Tangs, is located.
Wheelock Place – Used to house the Borders bookstore, one of the largest bookstores in the country until its closure in August 2011. It has a large Marks and Spencer outlet in the basement, as well as several other retailers, cafes and restaurants on other floors. It was formerly known as "Lane Crawford Place" which housed Lane Crawford until it closed during the 1997 Asian financial crisis.
Wisma Atria – Opened in 1986, it has since undergone construction replacing its trademark blue facade with a glass facade. There is a 900-seat food court on the 4th floor which is run by the BreadTalk Group. The shopping centre is directly connected to Orchard station. It stands on the former site of Wisma Indonesia which used to house the Indonesian embassy.

Transport

Public transport

Mass Rapid Transit (underground trains)
There are four major MRT stations in the Orchard Road vicinity: Orchard, Orchard Boulevard, Somerset and Dhoby Ghaut MRT stations. These stations are important hubs for commuters, locals, students and tourists who travel to the shopping and business district of Orchard.

Buses
Bus services provided by SBS Transit, SMRT Buses, Tower Transit Singapore and Go-Ahead Singapore provide access to Orchard Road. Bus stops are staggered to avoid causing congestion, with the scheme being implemented on 13 May 2004 (1st Phase, Mandarin Orchard Singapore) and 28 May 2004 (2nd Phase, Midpoint Orchard). A bus lane was introduced in 2005, operational from 7.30 am to 8 pm, Monday to Saturday. It was extended to 24 hours in 2016. The major bus stops along Orchard Road are situated at:
Delfi Orchard
Royal Thai Embassy, Singapore (opposite House of Hung Jewellers)
Tang Plaza
Lucky Plaza
The Heeren
Midpoint Orchard
Orchard Plaza
Concorde Hotel Singapore
Dhoby Ghaut MRT station
MacDonald House
YMCA

Westbound passengers can board their buses at Penang Road (Dhoby Ghaut Station), Somerset Road (Somerset Station), Orchard Turn (opp Ngee Ann City/Takashimaya), Orchard Turn (Orchard Station), Orchard Boulevard (opp Orchard Station) and Orchard Boulevard (Wheelock Place).

Taxi
Orchard Road has numerous taxi stands, which are mostly found at shopping centres and hotels. It is prohibited to hail taxis at locations other than these official stands.

Vehicular access 
Those driving into Orchard Road may enter from the west via Napier Road. Vehicles from Dunearn Road that travel via Scotts Road can turn left into Orchard Road at the Marriott Hotel junction. Vehicles coming from the opposite direction on Paterson Road can enter Orchard Road by turning right. There are also a number of other roads leading into Orchard Road. Orchard Road is one-way heading south and leads into Bras Basah Road which is a one-way street heading south.

See also 
 List of upscale shopping districts
 Anlene Orchard Mile

References

Sources 
 National Heritage Board (2002), Singapore's 100 Historic Places, Archipelago Press, 
 RedDot Publishing Inc (2005), The Official Map of Singapore, RedDot Publishing Inc.

 100mm of rain fell within 3 hours, causing floods, https://web.archive.org/web/20100619102022/http://news.xin.msn.com/en/singapore/article.aspx?cp-documentid=4153228
 Evolution of a Retail Streetscape: DP Architects on Orchard Road (2012), Images Publishing, Google Books
 The Straits Times | Who's Who of Orchard Road, http://graphics.straitstimes.com/STI/STIMEDIA/Interactives/2015/07/who-owns-orchard-road/index.html

External links

 
Places in Singapore
Roads in Singapore
Tourist attractions in Singapore
Shopping districts and streets in Singapore
Orchard, Singapore